Christopher Henry Smith (born March 4, 1953) is an American politician serving his 21st term as the U.S. representative for . Though it has taken various forms, his district has always been situated in central New Jersey. Currently, the district contains parts of Ocean and Monmouth counties.

Smith is the dean of New Jersey's congressional delegation and the longest-serving member of Congress in New Jersey's history. He has focused much of his career on promoting human rights abroad, including authoring the Victims of Trafficking and Violence Protection Act of 2000 and several follow-on laws. From 1993 to 2019, he was the top House Republican on the United States Commission on Security and Cooperation in Europe. He has used his leadership positions, including chairmanships, to author multiple pieces of legislation focused on human rights and conduct aggressive oversight of human rights abuses, actions that have earned him scorn from abusing nations.

Smith is a member of the Republican Party, having switched from the Democratic Party in 1978.

Early life, education, and early career
Smith was born in Rahway, New Jersey, on March 4, 1953. He attended St. Mary's High School in Perth Amboy, where he competed as a runner and wrestler.

After graduating with a B.A. in business administration from Trenton State College (now The College of New Jersey), Smith worked in his family's sporting goods business. In the 1976 election cycle, he managed the Democratic primary challenge of Steven Foley, an attorney and anti-abortion activist, against incumbent Senator Harrison Williams; Foley received about 15% of the vote, losing to Williams. In 1978, Smith switched to the Republican Party, and became executive director of the New Jersey Right to Life Committee, a part-time role.

U.S. House of Representatives

Elections

1978
In 1978, while working at his family's sporting goods store, 25-year-old Smith ran for Congress as a Republican. He lost to longtime Democratic incumbent U.S. Congressman Frank Thompson 61%–37%.

1980
In 1980, Smith ran against Thompson again. Initially, Smith was thought to have a very slim chance of winning, but Thompson was indicted as part of the FBI's Abscam probe. With the race now considered competitive, Republicans considered replacing Smith, but two alternative candidates seen as more competitive, Hamilton mayor John K. Rafferty and 1978 Senate nominee Jeff Bell, declined. Helped by Ronald Reagan's strong performance in the district, Smith defeated Thompson 57%–41%.

1982
In 1982, Smith's district was redrawn to include more Democratic voters and his Democratic opponent was former New Jersey Senate President Joseph P. Merlino, who had directly controlled the redistricting process and run a competitive campaign for governor the year before. It was widely assumed that Smith's 1980 victory over the scandal-plagued Thompson was a fluke, and that he would lose to the better-known Merlino. At the end of one of their debates, Smith approached Merlino to exchange pleasantries. Merlino was quoted as saying "Beat it, kid."

During the campaign, Merlino ran a negative ad comparing Smith to Jimmy Stewart's character in Mr. Smith Goes to Washington. In response, Stewart released a statement endorsing Smith and denouncing the ad: "When I played Mr. Smith in that picture, I did not think he was a naive hick. I thought he believed in honesty and integrity in government, the right of the people and the love of his country." Merlino pulled the ad.

Smith won the race with 52.7% of the vote.

Subsequently, a federal court found the 1982 redistricting was impermissible gerrymandering, and Smith's district was redrawn to more closely resemble the one used in 1980. He has not faced another contest that close since.

1984–present
From 1984 to 2016, Smith won reelection with over 60% of the vote.

In 2006, Smith's 66% was the highest percentage for any Republican in the New Jersey delegation.

In 2008, Smith defeated college history professor Joshua M. Zeitz, 66%–32%.

In 2010, Smith received 69.4% of the vote, ahead of Democratic nominee Howard Kleinhendler, Libertarian nominee Joe Siano, Green Party nominee Steven Welzer, and American Renaissance Movement nominee David Meiswinkle.

In 2018, Smith defeated Democratic nominee Joshua Welle with 55% of the vote to Welle's 43%. Smith was the only Republican to win a congressional race in New Jersey that year, reducing the GOP to its smallest presence in New Jersey's House delegation since 1918. This was Smith's closest election since 1982.

In 2020, Smith defeated Democratic nominee Stephanie Schmid.

In 2022, Smith defeated Democratic nominee Matthew Jenkins with 66.9% of the vote.

Tenure
Smith was ranked the 17th most bipartisan member of the House of Representatives during the 114th United States Congress (and the second most bipartisan from New Jersey) in the Bipartisan Index by the Lugar Center.

In November 1997, Smith was one of 18 House Republicans to co-sponsor a resolution by Bob Barr that sought to launch an impeachment inquiry against President Bill Clinton. The resolution did not specify any charges or allegations. This was an early effort to impeach Clinton, predating the Clinton–Lewinsky scandal. That scandal led to a more serious effort to impeach Clinton in 1998. On October 8, 1998, Smith voted in favor of legislation that was passed to open an impeachment inquiry. On December 19, 1998, he voted in favor of all four proposed articles of impeachment against Clinton (only two of which received the needed majority of votes to be adopted).

It was revealed in October 2015 that intern applicants for Smith's office were required to rate "27 different personalities, organizations and political issues to indicate whether they tend to agree with them, disagree with them or have no opinion or knowledge of them." Personalities and organizations included Rachel Maddow, the Pope, Planned Parenthood, and The National Right to Life Committee.

Smith has been nominated and confirmed twice to serve as a member of the United States delegation to the United Nations General Assembly. He was nominated by President Barack Obama in 2015 for the 70th session and by President Donald Trump in 2017 for the 72nd session.

Smith voted against both articles in the first impeachment of Donald Trump, and the sole article of the second impeachment of Donald Trump.

Unlike most House Republicans, Smith did not file an amicus curiae brief supporting Texas in Texas v. Pennsylvania.

On February 4, 2021, Smith voted with 10 other House Republicans and all House Democrats to strip Marjorie Taylor Greene of her House Education and Labor Committee and House Budget Committee assignments in response to controversial political statements she had made. On November 5, 2021, Smith was one of 13 House Republicans to break with their party and vote with a majority of Democrats in favor of the Infrastructure Investment and Jobs Act.

Veterans
In January 2001, Smith became chairman of the Veterans' Affairs Committee and pushed for policies Republican leadership opposed, including voting against the Republican and for the Democratic budget resolution because the latter included more spending on veterans programs. In 2004, Smith refused to endorse the Republican budget proposal unless it included more money for veterans. In a congressional hearing, Smith articulated his belief that the Bush Administration's budget request was $1.2 billion less than the Department of Veterans Affairs actually required, embarrassing the administration and Republican congressional leadership. During his four years as committee chair, Smith wrote 22 bills addressing veterans' issues. His unwillingness to follow the party line resulted in the House Republican Caucus removing him from his chairmanship (and from the committee altogether) in January 2005, at the beginning of the 109th Congress, with the chairmanship going to Steve Buyer instead, two years short of the normal six-year term. Veterans' groups such as the Veterans of Foreign Wars and Paralyzed Veterans of America praised Smith and criticized the decision to remove him.

Legislation

On May 6, 2014, Smith introduced the bill International Megan's Law to Prevent Demand for Child Sex Trafficking (H.R. 4573; 113th Congress), which would require the notification of foreign governments when an American registered as a sex offender of children travels to their country.

As of April 2020, FiveThirtyEight reported that Smith voted in line with Trump's position 67.7% of the time, the third-lowest percentage among Republican members of Congress after fellow New Jerseyan Jeff Van Drew and Brian Fitzpatrick. Relative to the partisan lean of their respective districts, only Van Drew and Kentucky Representative Thomas Massie were less likely than Smith to vote with Trump.

In March 2021, Smith was one of eight Republicans to join the House majority in passing the Bipartisan Background Checks Act of 2021.

Committee assignments 
 Committee on Foreign Affairs
 Subcommittee on Africa, Global Health, and Human Rights (Ranking member)
 Subcommittee on the Western Hemisphere
 Tom Lantos Human Rights Commission
 Congressional-Executive Commission on China

Caucus memberships 

 Republican Main Street Partnership
Republican Governance Group
Problem Solvers Caucus

Political positions

Abortion

Smith is strongly anti-abortion. He is a co-chairman of the Congressional Pro-Life Caucus and is co-chair of the Trump Administration's Pro-Life Coalition. He supports the Mexico City policy, which blocks U.S. federal funding for non-governmental organizations that provide abortion counseling or referrals, advocate to decriminalize abortion or expand abortion services. In 2000, he voted for the Partial-Birth Abortion Ban Act of 2000.

Smith expressed support for the Stupak-Pitts Amendment, an amendment to America's Affordable Health Choices Act of 2009.

Smith has introduced various forms of the No Taxpayer Funding for Abortion Act, starting with the original proposal in 2011. The 2011 proposal prohibited federal funds from being used for health benefits that cover abortion, unless in the case of rape, incest or if the woman could die. It also disqualified abortions from being written off on taxes. In 2013, Smith reintroduced the proposal, which further restricted insurance coverage of abortions. The bill passed the House but has yet to be voted on by the Senate.

Domestic violence
Smith voted for the original 1994 Violence Against Women Act and co-sponsored the reauthorization bills of 2000 and 2005, the latter of which provided $1.6 billion for investigation and prosecution of violent crimes against women, imposed automatic and mandatory restitution on those convicted, and allowed civil redress in cases prosecutors chose to leave un-prosecuted. Smith voted against reauthorizing the act in 2013, due to the Senate version of the bill's cutting of funding for the Trafficking in Persons Office at the State Department, which Smith's Victims of Trafficking and Violence Protection Act of 2000 created.

Environment 
As of 2020, Smith has a lifetime score of 62% on the National Environmental Scorecard of the League of Conservation Voters, the second-highest of any sitting Republican member (after Brian Fitzpatrick). He has said, "Climate change is a global challenge that must be addressed with a global solution."

Smith also opposes offshore drilling, particularly in New Jersey.

Smith backed a carbon emissions trading bill to tackle climate change, one of only eight Republicans in the House to do so.

Guns
Smith opposes concealed carry. In 2016, he was one of four Republicans to receive a 100% rating from the Brady Campaign to Prevent Gun Violence and has generally received low or intermediate ratings from pro-gun organizations Gun Owners of America and the National Rifle Association. Smith did not co-sponsor the Brady Campaign's proposed legislation to expand background checks for gun purchasers.

Smith was one of five Republicans to co-sponsor HR 8 in the 116th Congress, which would require mandatory background checks for gun sales.

Smith called the 2016 Orlando nightclub shooting "tragic beyond words" and said, "The terrorist's motive, if linked to radical Islamist ideology, underscores the escalating national and worldwide threat from global jihad."

In the wake of the 2017 Las Vegas shooting, Smith co-sponsored a ban on bump stocks with Leonard Lance.

Health care
Smith has written three major laws to address autism, including the most recent Autism CARES which included $1.3 billion in funding for research, services and supports and requires a report on aging out.

On May 9, 2014, Smith introduced the bill Autism CARES Act of 2014, a bill that would amend the Public Health Service Act to reauthorize research, surveillance, and education activities related to autism spectrum disorders (autism) conducted by various agencies within the United States Department of Health and Human Services (HHS).

On May 9, 2019, Smith was one of only three Republicans who voted for HR 986, a measure supported by all voting House Democrats intended to maintain protections of those with preexisting medical conditions to have continued access to affordable medical insurance under the existing provisions of the Affordable Care Act. Five weeks earlier, he had voted with seven other Republicans to pass a resolution condemning the Trump administration's efforts by Department of Justice to have the courts invalidate Obamacare.

Smith has been a longtime promoter of the medically unrecognized "chronic Lyme disease", and has pushed for the medical establishment to recognize the condition. The condition, not to be confused with genuine Lyme disease, is generally rejected by medical professionals, and its promotion is generally seen as health fraud. In 2019, Smith proposed an investigation into whether the Pentagon had released "weaponized" ticks infected with Lyme disease into the environment between 1950 and 1975. Scientists identified this proposal, which Congress did not adopt, as based on a conspiracy theory and claimed that an investigation was unnecessary and a poor use of funds.

Human rights

Smith advocates for human rights, serving on numerous committees that seek to impact both national and international laws and legislation. He has stated that the bills he introduces to the house are meant to make the U.S. take "human rights seriously."

In 1999, Smith proposed, as part of the American Embassy Security Act, to stop a U.S. sponsored program which provided training to Royal Ulster Constabulary with the FBI, due to claims of human rights violations, i.e. harassment of defense attorneys representing republicans in Northern Ireland. However, he voted no on a bill that halts arms sales to Saudi Arabia and removes troops from Yemen.

He supported the return David Goldman's son in the Goldman child abduction case, which involved a trip to Brazil. Smith acknowledges the Armenian genocide and has made calls for the U.S. to recognize it.

In 2017, Smith co-sponsored an effort to prioritize human rights in Azerbaijan with Jim McGovern. The H. Res. 537 act also seeks to see further implementation of the Magnitsky Act regarding Azerbaijani officials, as well as a call for Azerbaijan to release all political prisoners. He supports efforts to deport Jakiw Palij, a denaturalized former American citizen residing in New York who failed to disclose he worked as a guard at a concentration camp in Nazi Germany. Smith condemned Turkey's wide-ranging crackdown on dissent following a failed July 2016 coup.

China
Smith has held congressional hearings and has proposed bills regarding human rights violations, specifically around women's sexual health, activism and religious groups, in China. He staunchly opposes the forced sterilization and forced abortions being implemented by the Chinese government towards women regarding China's one-child policy. Regarding the victimization of these women, Smith stated that "the agony that those women carry with them is beyond words. They talk about the pain that they carry for their child and for the violation by the state." In response, Smith wrote a bill, which was put into law in 1999, making it illegal for the U.S. to issue visas to foreign nationals who have been involved in forced abortion or sterilization.

Smith held a congressional hearing regarding the disappearance of blind Chinese activist Chen Guangcheng. He attempted, in 2011, to visit Chen in China, when the activist was under house arrest, but was not granted permission. In response to the violations towards Chen and his family, Smith sponsored the China Democracy Promotion Act of 2011, which sought to prevent known Chinese human rights violators from entering the U.S.

In the wake of the 2014 Hong Kong class boycott campaign and Umbrella Movement, Smith co-sponsored the bipartisan Hong Kong Human Rights and Democracy Act, supporting Hong Kong's ongoing autonomy and the human rights of those Hong Kongers involved in nonviolent protests and/or those who have had their rights violated by the Chinese government.

In November 2018, Smith raised the issue of Xinjiang re-education camps and human rights abuses against the Uyghur Muslim minority. Smith said: "The internment of over a million Uyghurs and other Muslims in China is a staggering evil and should be treated by the international community as a crime against humanity. The Chinese government's creation of a vast system of what can only be called concentration camps cannot be tolerated in the 21st century."

In October 2022, Politico reported that Smith criticized some US-based financial executives attending the Global Financial Leaders' Investment Summit, saying that companies "that trumpet their so-called 'Environmental, Social and Governance Principles' at home are quick to discard these 'values' for a chance to make a profit from China."

South Korea
Smith has indicated his serious concern on the amendment of the Development of Inter-Korean Relations Act in South Korea which passed the South Korean National Assembly on December 14, 2020. It penalizes activists who send anti-North Korean material across the border as balloon propaganda. It was passed by the super-majority of the ruling party of President Moon Jae-in who is keen to improve cross-border ties. Smith stated that "While I would hope that members of Korea’s Democratic Party would see how damaging this proposed legislation is to democratic principles and human rights, and thus reverse course, in the event that they pass such a law, I call upon our State Department to critically reevaluate the Republic of Korea’s commitment to democratic values in its annual human rights report, as well as in its report on international religious freedom.  It may very well be that we will see South Korea put on a watch list, which would be a very sad development indeed."

Religion
Smith supports religious rights regarding international human rights. He supports sanctions against Vietnam regarding its treatment of Catholics and China regarding the Uyghurs and Falun Gong.

Immigration
Smith supported the Indonesian Family Refugee Protection Act in 2012, which would have extended the deadline for Indonesian immigrants to file for citizenship.

Intellectual property rights
Smith authored the Global Online Freedom Act in 2007, but it did not become law.  The proposed legislation was a bill  "to promote freedom of expression on the Internet, to protect United States businesses from coercion to participate in repression by authoritarian foreign governments, and for other purposes."  Specifically, the bill would prohibit American companies from turning over data about customers residing in "internet restrictive countries." The bill is supported by Amnesty International, Human Rights Watch and Reporters Without Borders. It is opposed by the Electronic Frontier Foundation.

January 6 commission
On May 19, 2021, Smith was one of 35 Republicans who joined all Democrats in voting to approve legislation to establish the January 6 commission meant to investigate the U.S. Capitol attack.

LGBT rights
In 2015, Smith said he did not consider same-sex marriage a fundamental human right as defined by the United Nations.

In July 2022, Smith voted against the Respect for Marriage Act, a bill that required the U.S. federal government to recognize the validity of same-sex marriages.

Labor movement 
Smith supports the Employee Free Choice Act. The AFL-CIO Legislative Scorecard, which tracks support for workers' rights, gives Smith a 61% lifetime rating, ranking him seventh of New Jersey's twelve Representatives, and 195th of the House's 435 Representatives.

The AFL-CIO endorsed Smith for re-election in 2018, calling him one of the "best candidates for working people," due to his support for collective bargaining, opposition to the Janus v. AFSCME Supreme Court decision, and support for infrastructure funding, among other reasons.

As of March 2019, Smith is the only Republican co-sponsor of the Paycheck Fairness Act. He also supported the Lilly Ledbetter Fair Pay Act of 2009, which expanded the scope of the statute of limitations for pay discrimination.

Smith cited the example of Lech Walesa and the Solidarity movement as a reason he support unions. He also said of his fellow Republicans, "What my Republican colleagues often don't understand is that labor is a human-rights issue".

Marijuana 

Smith has a "D" rating from NORML regarding his voting record on cannabis-related matters. He has consistently voted against the Veterans Equal Access Amendment, which provides veterans access to information regarding medical marijuana accessibility in their respective states.

Veterans affairs
Bob Wallace, executive director of the Veterans of Foreign Wars calls Smith "the best friend" of veterans. In 2004, Smith refused to endorse the Republican budget proposal unless it included more money for veterans. In a congressional hearing, Smith publicly articulated his belief that the Bush Administration's budget request was $1.2 billion less than the Department of Veterans Affairs actually required, embarrassing the administration and Republican congressional leadership. In 2005, Smith was removed from his chairmanship and membership on the Veterans Affair Committee for his aggressive role in seeking more funding for veteran-related causes.

Science policy
Smith supports efforts to provide alternatives to embryonic stem cell research. In 2005, he co-sponsored a bill with Artur Davis to fund the creation of a network of national blood banks to distribute umbilical cord blood for stem cell research.

Taxation
Smith voted against the 2017 Republican tax legislation backed by Donald Trump; he was one of five Republican representatives from New Jersey who joined Democrats in opposing the bill. Smith opposed the bill as "unfair to the taxpayers of New Jersey" because it dramatically limited the federal reduction of state and local taxes (SALT). and said he would be "forced to oppose" more tax cuts if legislation included a provision permanently extending the $10,000 cap on the SALT deduction.

Electoral history

|+ : Results 1978–2022
! Year
!
! Republican
! Votes
! %
!
! Democratic
! Votes
! %
!
! Third Party
! Party
! Votes
! %
!
! Third Party
! Party
! Votes
! %
!
|-
|1978
||
| |Chris Smith
| |41,833
| |36.9%
|
| |Frank Thompson (Inc)
| |69,259
| |61.1%
|
| |John Valjean Mahalchik
| |Independent
| |1,145
| |1%
|
| |Paul Rizzo
| |No Slogan
| |827
| |1%
|
|-
|1980
||
| |Chris Smith
| |95,447
| |57%
|
| |Frank Thompson (Inc)
| |68,480
| |41%
|
| |Jack Moyers
| |Libertarian
| |2,801
| |2%
|
| |Paul Rizzo
| |No Slogan
| |1,776
| |1%
|
|-
|1982
||
| |Chris Smith
| |85,660
| |53%
|
| |Joseph Merlino
| |75,658
| |47%
|
| |Bill Harris
| |Libertarian
| |662
| |0%
|
| |Paul Rizzo
| |No Slogan
| |374
| |0%
|*
|-
|1984
||
| |Chris Smith
| |139,295
| |61%
|
| |James Hedden
| |87,908
| |39%
|
|
|
|
|
|
|
|
|
|
|
|-
|1986
||
| |Chris Smith
| |78,699
| |61%
|
| |Jeffrey Laurenti
| |49,290
| |38%
|
| |Earl Dickey
| |Stop Financing Communism
| |789
| |1%
|
|
|
|
|
|
|-
|1988
||
| |Chris Smith
| |155,283
| |66%
|
| |Betty Holland
| |79,006
| |33%
|
| |Judson Carter
| |Independent
| |1,114
| |0%
|
| |Daniel Maiullo
| |Libertarian
| |791
| |0%
|
|-
|1990
||
| |Chris Smith
| |99,920
| |63%
|
| |Mark Setaro
| |54,961
| |35%
|
| |Carl Peters
| |Libertarian
| |2,178
| |1%
|
|! style="background:#FF7575; "|Joseph Notarangelo
|! style="background:#FF7575; "|Populist
|! style="background:#FF7575; "|1,206
|! style="background:#FF7575; "|1%
|*
|-
|1992
||
| |Chris Smith
| |149,095
| |62%
|
| |Brian Hughes
| |84,514
| |35%
|
| |Benjamin Grindlinger
| |Libertarian
| |2,984
| |1%
|
| |Patrick Pasculi
| |Independent
| |2,137
| |1%
|*
|-
|1994
||
| |Chris Smith
| |109,818
| |68%
|
| |Ralph Walsh
| |49,537
| |31%
|
| |Leonard Marshall
| |Conservative
| |1,579
| |1%
|
|! style="background:#00bfff; "|Arnold Kokans
|! style="background:#00bfff; "|Natural Law
|! style="background:#00bfff; "|833
|! style="background:#00bfff; "|1%
|
|-
|1996
||
| |Chris Smith
| |146,404
| |64%
|
| |Kevin Meara
| |77,565
| |34%
|
| |Robert Figueroa
| |Independent
| |3,000
| |1%
|
| |J. Morgan Strong
| |Independent
| |2,034
| |1%
|*
|-
|1998
||
| |Chris Smith
| |92,991
| |62%
|
| |Larry Schneider
| |52,281
| |35%
|
| |Keith Quarles
| |Independent
| |1,753
| |1%
|
| |Morgan Strong
| |Independent
| |1,495
| |1%
|*
|-
|2000
||
| |Chris Smith
| |158,515
| |63%
|
| |Reed Gusciora
| |87,956
| |35%
|
| |Stuart Chaifetz
| |Independent
| |3,627
| |1%
|
| |Paul Teel
| |Independent
| |712
| |0%
|
|-
|2002
||
| |Chris Smith
| |115,293
| |66%
|
| |Mary Brennan
| |55,967
| |32%
|
| |Keith Quarles
| |Libertarian
| |1,211
| |1%
|
| |Hermann Winkelmann
| |Honesty, Humanity, Duty
| |1,063
| |1%
|*
|-
|2004
||
| |Chris Smith
| |192,671
| |67%
|
| |Amy Vasquez
| |92,826
| |32%
|
| |Richard Edgar
| |Libertarian
| |2,056
| |1%
|
|
|
|
|
|
|-
|2006
||
| |Chris Smith
| |124,482
| |66%
|
| |Carol Gay
| |62,902
| |33%
|
| |Richard Edgar
| |Libertarian
| |1,539
| |1%
|
| |Louis Wary
| |Remove Medical Negligence
| |614
| |0%
|
|-
|2008
||
| |Chris Smith
| |202,972
| |66%
|
| |Joshua Zeitz
| |100,036
| |32%
|
| |Steven Welzer
| |Green
| |3,543
| |1%
|
|
|
|
|
|
|-
|2010
||
| |Chris Smith
| |129,752
| |69%
|
| |Howard Kleinhendler
| |52,118
| |28%
|
| |Joe Siano
| |Libertarian
| |2,912
| |2%
|
| |Steven Welzer
| |Green
| |1,574
| |1%
|*
|-
|2012
||
| |Chris Smith
| |195,146
| |64%
|
| |Brian Froelich
| |107,992
| |35%
|
| |Leonard Marshall
| |No Slogan
| |3,111
| |1%
|
|
|
|
|
|
|-
|2014
||
| |Chris Smith
| |118,826
| |68%
|
| |Ruben Scolavino
| |54,415
| |31%
|
| |Scott Neuman
| |D-R Party
| |1,608
| |1%
|
|
|
|
|
|
|-
|2016
||
| |Chris Smith
| |211,992
| |64%
|
| |Lorna Phillipson
| |111,532
| |34%
|
| |Hank Schroeder
| |Economic Growth
| |5,840
| |2%
|
| |Jeremy Marcus
| |Libertarian
| |3,320
| |1%
|
|-
|2018
||
| |Chris Smith
| |159,965
| |55%
|
| |Joshua Welle
| |123,995
| |43%
|
| |Michael Rufo
| |Libertarian
| |1,352
| |1%
|
| |Ed Stackhouse
| |Independent
| |1,034
| |0%
|*
|-
|2020
||
| |Chris Smith
| |254,103
| |60%
|
| |Stephanie Schmid
| |162,420
| |38%
|
| |Hank Schroeder
| |Independent
| |3,195
| |1%
|
| |Michael Rufo
| |Libertarian
| |2,583
| |1%
|*
|-
|2022
||
| |Chris Smith
| |173,288	
| |66%
|
| |Matthew Jenkins
| |81,233	
| |31%
|
| |	Jason Cullen
| |Libertarian
| |1,902
| |0.7%
|*
| |David Schmidt
| |Independent 
| |1,197	
| |0.5%
|*

 In elections marked with an asterisk (*), additional candidates received less than 1% of the vote.

References

External links

 Congressman Chris Smith official U.S. House website
 Chris Smith for Congress
 
 
 
 Smith: China's illegal organ harvesting September 18, 2012, Washington Times

|-

|-

|-

|-

|-

|-

|-

|-

|-

|-

|-

1953 births
21st-century American politicians
American anti-abortion activists
American Roman Catholics
Catholics from New Jersey
Living people
People from Hamilton Township, Mercer County, New Jersey
People from Rahway, New Jersey
People from Robbinsville Township, New Jersey
People from Woodbridge Township, New Jersey
Republican Party members of the United States House of Representatives from New Jersey
The College of New Jersey alumni